Fosston is a city in Polk County, Minnesota, United States. It is part of the Greater Grand Forks region. The population was 1,434 at the time of the 2020 census.

Geography

Four-lane U.S. Highway 2 serves as a main route in the city.

Climate

Demographics

2010 census
As of the census of 2010, there were 1,571 people, 670 households, and 367 families living in the city. The racial makeup of the city was 94.0% White, 2.9% Native American, 0.4% Asian, and 2.8% from two or more races. Hispanic or Latino of any race were 2.2% of the population.

There were 670 households, of which 27.0% had children under the age of 18 living with them, 37.5% were married couples living together, 11.9% had a female householder with no husband present, 5.4% had a male householder with no wife present, and 45.2% were non-families. 41.0% of all households were made up of individuals, and 22.3% had someone living alone who was 65 years of age or older. The average household size was 2.14 and the average family size was 2.89.

The median age in the city was 43 years. 25.5% of residents were under the age of 18; 6.3% were between the ages of 18 and 24; 20.2% were from 25 to 44; 21.9% were from 45 to 64; and 26% were 65 years of age or older. The gender makeup of the city was 46.9% male and 53.1% female.

2000 census
As of the census of 2000, there were 1,575 people, 681 households, and 379 families living in the city. The racial makeup of the city was 96.70% White, 0.19% African American, 1.52% Native American, 0.51% Asian, 0.06% Pacific Islander, 0.06% from other races, and 0.95% from two or more races. Hispanic or Latino of any race were 0.57% of the population.

There were 681 households, out of which 26.0% had children under the age of 18 living with them, 42.4% were married couples living together, 10.0% had a female householder with no husband present, and 44.2% were non-families. 40.2% of all households were made up of individuals, and 25.3% had someone living alone who was 65 years of age or older. The average household size was 2.16 and the average family size was 2.92.

In the city, the population was spread out, with 23.1% under the age of 18, 6.5% from 18 to 24, 22.2% from 25 to 44, 19.6% from 45 to 64, and 28.7% who were 65 years of age or older. The median age was 44 years. For every 100 females, there were 83.4 males. For every 100 females age 18 and over, there were 78.4 males.

The median income for a household in the city was $27,634, and the median income for a family was $40,521. Males had a median income of $29,688 versus $21,176 for females. The per capita income for the city was $17,064. About 11.4% of families and 14.9% of the population were below the poverty line, including 15.6% of those under age 18 and 21.1% of those age 65 or over.

History
In the year 1876 the first white settlers came to the Fosston area, arriving in covered wagons, bringing with them a few cattle, oxen, horses and mules. Charles Adair, with his family was the first to file a claim on the land, with nine others soon following. Fosston, is located in sections 3 and 4 of Rosebud Township, and was named in honor of Louis Foss, an immigrant from the village Nyttingnes in Sogn og Fjordane county, Norway. The townsite was organized by W. J. Hilligoss, who selected and purchased the townsite in 1884, had it surveyed, platted a four-block area, and built a hotel. Hilligoss died in 1941. The town was named Fosston when Louis Foss moved his store and opened a post office there. The village was incorporated on August 22, 1895. The incorporation papers of Fosston were recorded June 8, 1889, by the Register of Deeds in Crookston, the County Seat of Polk County, Minnesota. Fosston was a busy depot on the Great Northern Railway line.

Cordwood Pete
In an effort to promote tourism in Fosston, the legend of "Cordwood Pete" was created by Arvid Clementson, who served as Fosston's mayor until his death in 2006. In what he described as a "true story, embellished", Clementson claimed the complete story of Cordwood Pete was discovered in the spring of 2001 when a time capsule was discovered during the demolition of one of Fosston's oldest buildings.

Cordwood Pete, was said to be the younger brother of famed lumberjack Paul Bunyan. While Paul Bunyan was a giant, Pete was a mere 4 feet 9 inches in height. According to the tale, Pete's growth was stunted by the fact that he could never get enough flapjacks at the breakfast table because brother Paul ate everything in sight.

According to legend, Paul Bunyan left his home in Bangor, Maine, to make his way in the world, and ended up in the north woods of Minnesota where he excelled as a lumberjack. Pete, tired of being mocked by lumberjacks in Maine over his size, followed Paul to Minnesota, and despite his diminutive stature, found work as a lumberjack near Fosston, Minnesota, taking the name Peter Delang.

Local lumberjacks nicknamed him "Cordwood Pete" because his size suggested he was more suited to cutting cordwood than felling huge trees. Pete spent much time in the local saloons, and his fellow lumberjacks soon learned he was hot tempered and full of spunk, especially after imbibing. They came to admire his feisty spirit, and no one dared fight the little man.

Legend has it that he "borrowed" his bother's double-bladed ax one day. He swung the ax, and the weight of the huge thing kept the ax spinning round and round as if in perpetual motion. When the ax finally stopped spinning, 100 acres of timber had been felled. The railroad hired Pete the next day to clear a path for their tracks, and before the day was over, he had clear-cut fifty square miles of timber. Pete had to give his brother's ax back to him the next day, and he never again achieved such a lumberjacking feat.

After that Pete stuck to cutting cordwood, which he hauled to market with the help of his little donkey named Tamarack. He died at the age of 84.

Authors Richard Dorson and Marshall Fitwick cite Paul Bunyan as an example of "fakelore", or a modern story passed off as an older folktale. Cordwood Pete may also qualify as a more modern example of fakelore.

High School Sports
Fosston's boys basketball team won the first-ever state basketball championship in 1913.  In 2002, the girls basketball team set the state consecutive win record, winning 78 games between 1999 and 2002.

Media

Radio
 KKCQ (AM) 1480 “The Information Station” - Talk licensed to Fosston
 KKCQ-FM 96.7 “Q-Country 96.7” - Country 
(studios in Fosston, licensed to nearby Bagley, MN. Owned by R & J Broadcasting.
 KKEQ FM 107.1 “QFM” - contemporary Christian music. 
(Owned by Pine to Prairie Broadcasting. QFM's city of license is Fosston, but studios are split between Grand Forks, ND and Bemidji, MN)

Other radio and television stations from Bemidji, Thief River Falls, Crookston, Grand Forks, ND, and Fargo, ND can also be received.

Print
There is one local newspaper, "The 13 Towns", with additional newspapers Grand Forks Herald (Grand Forks), The Forum (Fargo, ND), The Pioneer (Bemidji), and Star Tribune (Minneapolis) available via subscription or at newsboxes.

Notable people
Lily Hanson, writer and comedian
Edgar Olson, politician and farmer
Francis Stadsvold, basketball player and coach
Reuben Harold Tweten  politician and farmer

References

External links
City of Fosston, MN -- Official site
Television News report on Cordwood Pete

Cities in Minnesota
Cities in Polk County, Minnesota